Lilla Jönssonligan is a Swedish film series that consists of four movies. The film series is a spin-off of the original Jönssonligan film series, featuring the main characters as kids instead of adults. Unlike the "adult Jönssonligan", where the gang where bumbling anti-heroes, the "litte Jönssonligan" is often straight up heroic.

Unlike the regular Jönssonligan, the kid version was an original Swedish idea, with Denmark and Norway later following suit, with Olsen-banden Junior and Olsenbanden Jr. respectively.

Films 
Four feature films have been made . Lilla Jönssonligan och cornflakeskuppen takes place in the 1950s and works as an origin story for the gang. Lilla Jönssonligan och stjärnkuppen does not take place in the same canon as the first three films or the original series as it is set in modern day.

Characters 
The gang consists of the criminal genius Charles Ingvar "Sickan" Jönsson, hence the name Jönssonligan, and his two companions Harry (aka Dynamit-Harry) and Ragnar Vanheden.

The gang's arch-enemy is Morgan "Junior" Wall-Enberg and his henchman, Biffen. Loa Falkman plays Wall-Enberg "Senior" in all the films. Junior does not appear in the fourth film.

Cast

Trio in the first two films 
 Kalle Eriksson as Charles-Ingvar 'Sickan' Jönsson
 Jonathan Flumee as Ragnar Vanheden
 Fredrik Glimskär as Dynamit Harry

Trio in the third film 
 Conrad Cronheim as Charles-Ingvar 'Sickan' Jönsson
 Buster Söderström as Ragnar Vanheden
 Anton Pettersson as Dynamit Harry

Trio in the fourth film 
 Mikael Lidgarv as Charles-Ingvar 'Sickan' Jönsson
 Hugo Flytström as Dynamit Harry
 Axel Skogberg as Ragnar Vanheden

External links 
 
 

Swedish children's films
 
Swedish comedy films
Swedish film series
Film series introduced in 1996
Tetralogies